Oswal Andrés Álvarez Salazar (born 11 June 1995) is a Colombian footballer who plays as a striker for Patriotas in the Categoría Primera A.

Club career 

Álvarez joined Anderlecht in 2012 from Academia F.C. He made his Belgian Pro League debut at 20 December 2014 against Waasland-Beveren. He replaced Ibrahima Conté after 88 minutes in a 0-2 away win.

References

External links

1995 births
Living people
Colombian footballers
Academia F.C. players
R.S.C. Anderlecht players
Patriotas Boyacá footballers
Categoría Primera A players
Categoría Primera B players
Belgian Pro League players
Colombian expatriate footballers
Expatriate footballers in Belgium
Association football forwards
People from La Guajira Department